Cunico is a comune (municipality) in the Province of Asti in the Italian region Piedmont, located about  east of Turin and about  northwest of Asti.

Cunico borders the following municipalities: Cortanze, Montechiaro d'Asti, Montiglio Monferrato, Piea, and Piovà Massaia.

Demographic evolution

References

Cities and towns in Piedmont